Derik Osede Prieto (born 21 February 1993), known simply as Derik, is a Spanish professional footballer who plays as a central defender.

Club career

Real Madrid
Born in Madrid to a Nigerian father and a Spanish mother, Derik started playing organised football at the age of eight, joining local club DAV Santa Ana's youth ranks. He finished his development with Real Madrid, going on to make his debut as a senior with the C team and helping them return to Segunda División B in 2012.

Derik was called to Real Madrid Castilla for the 2012 preseason, but still appeared in some more matches for the C's. His first competitive appearance for the reserves took place on 20 October 2012, playing the full 90 minutes in a 0–1 away loss to Córdoba CF in the Segunda División.

On 1 February 2014, Derik scored his first professional goal to open a 4–0 win against Hércules CF at the Alfredo di Stéfano Stadium. The season ended with relegation, with 18 games (17 starts) from the player.

Bolton Wanderers
On 6 July 2015, after a further two full seasons with Madrid B, free agent Derik signed a three-year contract for Bolton Wanderers after a successful trial. He made his debut in the Football League Championship on 12 September, playing the whole of a 2–1 home victory over Wolverhampton Wanderers.

Derik finished his first year with exactly half of the league matches played, as the team were relegated after ranking last. He scored his first goal for them on 9 August 2017, in a 2–1 away defeat of Crewe Alexandra in the EFL Cup.

On 24 May 2018, it was confirmed that Derik would leave the Macron Stadium on 30 June.

Numancia
Derik joined Spanish second division side CD Numancia on 26 November 2018 on a two-year deal, after impressing on a trial basis. He did not debut until the following 12 January, when he played the whole of a 1–1 draw at CF Reus Deportiu. 

Derik scored his first goal for the club from Soria on 18 September 2019, as they came from behind to draw 3–3 at Deportivo de La Coruña. He left in July 2020 as his contract expired, after suffering relegation.

Deportivo
On 5 October 2020, free agent Derik moved to also-relegated Deportivo on a one-year deal. His time in Galicia was fraught with injuries to his Achilles tendon.

International career
Derik appeared with the Spain under-19 team at the 2012 UEFA European Championship, helping to a final win in Estonia. With the under-20 side at the 2013 FIFA World Cup in Turkey, he scored in a 2–1 victory over Mexico in the last 16. 

In June 2015, Derik stated he wished to switch international allegiance to Nigeria.

Club statistics

Club

Honours
Spain U19
UEFA European Under-19 Championship: 2012

References

External links

1993 births
Living people
Spanish people of Nigerian descent
Sportspeople of Nigerian descent
Spanish sportspeople of African descent
Spanish footballers
Footballers from Madrid
Association football defenders
Segunda División players
Segunda División B players
Tercera División players
Real Madrid C footballers
Real Madrid Castilla footballers
CD Numancia players
Deportivo de La Coruña players
CD Alcoyano footballers
English Football League players
Bolton Wanderers F.C. players
Spain youth international footballers
Spain under-21 international footballers
Spanish expatriate footballers
Expatriate footballers in England
Spanish expatriate sportspeople in England